Ertuğrul Ersoy (born 13 February 1997) is a Turkish professional footballer who plays as a defender for Süper Lig club Gaziantep and the Turkey national team.

Club career
Ersoy made his Süper Lig debut for Bursaspor on 1 November 2014. On 26 August 2019, he joined Le Havre. In January 2021, he joined Gaziantep on loan until 2022. On 8 February 2022, Le Havre and Gaziantep agreed on a permanent transfer.

International career
Ersoy made his debut for Turkey on 11 October 2018 in a friendly against Bosnia and Herzegovina.

References

External links
 
 
 
 

1997 births
Living people
People from Gölcük
Association football defenders
Turkish footballers
Turkey youth international footballers
Turkey under-21 international footballers
Turkey international footballers
Bursaspor footballers
Çaykur Rizespor footballers
Le Havre AC players
Gaziantep F.K. footballers
Süper Lig players
Ligue 2 players
Turkish expatriate footballers
Expatriate footballers in France
Turkish expatriate sportspeople in France